= Helmer Strik =

Dutch computational linguist

Helmer Strik (full name: Wilhelmus Albertus Johannes Strik) is a Dutch language and speech scientist and associate professor at Radboud University. He serves as Chair of the Special Interest Group on Speech and Language Technology in Education (SLaTE) of the International Speech Communication Association (ISCA) and is co-founder of the educational technology company NovoLanguage.

== Career ==
Strik is an associate professor at the Centre for Language and Speech Technology (CLST) at Radboud University in Nijmegen, Netherlands. He has been a member of the ISCA Special Interest Group on Speech and Language Technology in Education (SLaTE) since its establishment, and has been chair since 2015, leading international efforts to advance speech technology applications in educational contexts.

In 2013, Strik co-founded NovoLanguage, a Radboud University spin-off company specializing in speech recognition technology for language learning. The company was recognized as "Gelderse Start Up van het jaar" (Gelderland Startup of the Year) in 2015. NovoLanguage's technology has been integrated into educational tools, such as the Automatic Speech Recognition based Reading Tutor system of publisher Zwijsen, which is used in primary schools across the Netherlands

== Research and impact ==
Strik's research focuses on computer-assisted pronunciation training (CAPT), automatic speech recognition for language learning, and speech technology applications in education. His work addresses the development of intelligent tutoring systems that provide automated feedback to language learners.

His research has led to practical applications including the DART (Dutch ASR-based Reading Tutor) system, the first reading tutor with automatic speech recognition developed for Dutch that provides instant feedback while practicing decoding skills. As of 2023, between 1,200 and 1,400 students use the Reading Tutor daily, generating approximately 60,000 recordings per day. From March 2023, the Reading Tutor became available in the educational product 'Veilig leren lezen' by publisher Zwijsen, following a pilot in approximately one hundred schools in the Netherlands and Flanders.

Strik is also involved in the DACIL (Developing A digital COPD companion for Improving Lifestyle) project, which aims to support people with COPD by developing a digital coach that monitors the condition in the home environment and provides advice based on analyzing speech and breathing, supported by artificial intelligence. The project is part of the NWO Knowledge and Innovation Covenant (KIC) programme 'Access to care in the living environment'.

== Selected recognition ==
- Co-founder of NovoLanguage, named "Gelderse Start Up van het jaar" (2015)
- Chair of ISCA Special Interest Group on Speech and Language Technology in Education
- Principal investigator on projects resulting in educational technology deployed in between 1,200 and 1, 400 schools
